Arminoidea is a superfamily of small sea slugs, marine gastropod molluscs in the clade Nudibranchia.

Arminoidea is the only superfamily in the clade Euarminida.

Families
A study, published in 2000, has demonstrated that Arminoidea is paraphyletic.

The taxonomy of the Arminoidea in the taxonomy of Bouchet & Rocroi (2005) contains two families as follows:

 Family Arminidae
 Family Doridomorphidae

References

Nudipleura
Taxa named by Constantine Samuel Rafinesque